Call of Cthulhu may refer to:
 "The Call of Cthulhu", the original 1928 short story by H. P. Lovecraft


Film
 The Call of Cthulhu (film), a 2005 silent film, distributed by the H. P. Lovecraft Historical Society
 Call Girl of Cthulhu, an indie horror film by Chris LaMartina

Gaming
 Call of Cthulhu (role-playing game), published by Chaosium (first edition, 1981)
 Call of Cthulhu: Shadow of the Comet, a 1993 adventure game
 Call of Cthulhu: The Card Game (2008), published by Fantasy Flight Games
 Call of Cthulhu: Dark Corners of the Earth, a 2005 first-person survival horror video game
 Call of Cthulhu: The Wasted Land, a 2012 tactical RPG video game
 Call of Cthulhu (video game), a 2018 survival horror role-playing video game

Other uses
"The Call of Ktulu", a track on the 1984 Metallica album Ride the Lightning

See also
The Call of Cthulhu and Other Weird Stories, an anthology of works by H. P. Lovecraft
"The Collect Call of Cathulhu", an episode of The Real Ghostbusters (1987)